Siyabonga Mpontshane (born 17 April 1986) is a South African professional soccer player who plays as a goalkeeper for Orlando Pirates.

Playing career
Mpontshane was signed from the National First Division side Nathi Lions in 2010 and made his debut in a 3–2 win over Mpumalanga Black Aces on 29 August 2010.

References

1986 births
Living people
People from Jozini Local Municipality
South African soccer players
Association football goalkeepers
Platinum Stars F.C. players
Nathi Lions F.C. players
Soccer players from KwaZulu-Natal
South Africa A' international soccer players
2014 African Nations Championship players